Truchas is a census-designated place in Rio Arriba County, New Mexico, United States. Located along the scenic High Road to Taos, it is halfway between Santa Fe in the south, and Taos to the north.

Truchas has the ZIP code 87578. The 87578 ZIP Code Tabulation Area, which includes the nearby village of Cordova, New Mexico, had a population of 560 at the 2010 census.

Overview

Straddling a high ridge, the community began as the Nuestra Señora del Rosario, San Fernando y Santiago del Rio de las Truchas Grant, a Spanish land grant in 1754 and, due to its geography and location, remained a relatively unchanged outpost over the centuries. The land grant is commonly known as the Truchas Land Grant, gaining its name from the river that provides the water for irrigation of the land. Truchas is the Spanish word for trout.

Nuestra Señora del Rosario is also the name of the early nineteenth-century church in the center of the village. The church contains two large altar-screens (reredos) by the renowned santero Pedro Antonio Fresquis. One screen is dated 1821, and there are other fine examples of early nineteenth-century santero art in the church.

The community remains remote, located at 8000 feet above sea level. A paved road did not enter the community till the early 1970s. These very same issues made the community attractive to artists moving to Northern New Mexico for its thriving arts scene, particularly after Robert Redford's The Milagro Beanfield War (1988) was filmed there. The arrival of the artist has altered the traditional pace of agricultural life among the original Spanish settlers, at times leading to tensions, which have more recently receded. There are also a number of vacation and second homes in the village and in the surrounding area.

Because the community had remained unchanged for so long, it still operates under many of the original Spanish land grant bylaws; for example, cars must share the roads with livestock.

The community has close views of the Truchas Peaks (nearly 5,000 feet above the community) and of the Española Valley.

Cultural references
 The settlement is mentioned in Willa Cather's 1927 novel Death Comes for the Archbishop
 Much of The Milagro Beanfield War (1988) was filmed on location in Truchas. It also employed a number of local inhabitants as actors in smaller roles.
 Great States, an American alternative rock band, makes two references to Truchas in their debut album Gatsby. These include a song titled "Truchas," and a reference made in a song titled "Cordova, NM."

See also

 List of census-designated places in New Mexico

References

External links

 Truchas article and photo gallery at The Armchair Explorer
 Climate summary for Truchas, 1914-1962 at Western Regional Climate Center
 Pedro Antonio Fresquís 1779-1831, Smithsonian American Art Museum
 Lisa Law: Social Activism, Smithsonian Museum of American History

Sangre de Cristo Mountains
Census-designated places in New Mexico
Census-designated places in Rio Arriba County, New Mexico